Avon County Rowing Club is a rowing club on the River Avon based at the Saltford Rowing Centre, Bath Road, Saltford, Bristol.

History
The club was founded in 1973 as a result of a merger between two clubs called the Avon Rowing Club and Bristol Rowing Club. The boathouse is shared between the University of Bristol Boat Club, Monkton Combe School Boat Club, Canoe Avon and the Bristol Empire Dragon Boat club.

The club has produced multiple British champions.

Honours

British champions

References

Sport in Bristol
Rowing clubs in England
Rowing clubs of the River Avon